Maganes is one of 54 parish councils in Cangas del Narcea, a municipality within the province and autonomous community of Asturias, in northern Spain. 

Villages
 Vaḷḷicieḷḷu
 Ordiales
 Ḷḷuarnes
 Soucéu

References

Parishes in Cangas del Narcea